Michael Skrzypcak (September 24, 1954 – February 19, 1988) best known by his stage name Eric Stryker, was an American  gay pornographic performer and model. He was known for his handsome blond features and his muscular physique. He also performed as Noel Kemp for Colt Studio, Mike Kelly, Mike Saunders and, Michael John Saunders.

In 1984, shortly after his lover died from AIDS, Stryker was diagnosed with HIV. His response was to focus his activities away from the life of a porn star and become an activist for AIDS awareness. Stryker continued his studies in architecture at Woodbury University and his regular workouts. As he put it, "I live for the day." He worked with the AIDS Couples Group and lectured around the country for the AIDS Project Los Angeles. In 1987, he appeared in the  documentary It Starts with A, his last film appearance. In his last public appearance, his body showing the effects of Kaposi's sarcoma, he marched in the Christopher Street West parade in Los Angeles in a tank top and shorts, becoming one of the early persons with the disease to publicly display its symptoms. On February 19, 1988, he died of AIDS at Sherman Oaks Community Hospital. He was 33.

See also 
 List of male performers in gay porn films

References 

American male pornographic film actors
1954 births
1988 deaths
AIDS-related deaths in California
American actors in gay pornographic films
Woodbury University alumni
LGBT pornographic film actors
American LGBT actors
LGBT people from Pennsylvania
Pornographic film actors from Pennsylvania
20th-century American male actors
20th-century American LGBT people
People from Erie, Pennsylvania